James Joicey may refer to:

 James Joicey, 1st Baron Joicey (1846–1936), mining businessman and politician
 James John Joicey (1870–1932), entomologist